Midtown Plaza is a city district that is redeveloped for various uses. It used to be an indoor shopping mall in downtown Rochester, New York, the first urban indoor mall in the United States.

History
The Midtown Plaza venture was announced to great fanfare in January 1958. Early tenants, in addition to B. Forman Co. and McCurdy's, included Wegmans, Lincoln Rochester Bank (now Chase Bank), the United States Postal Service and Trailways, as well as several national and local chain stores. The mall opened April 10, 1962.

Designed by Victor Gruen, Midtown Plaza was dedicated on April 10, 1962, as the first downtown indoor mall in the United States. The first enclosed shopping center had been Southdale Center in suburban Minneapolis in 1956, also designed by Gruen. The idea for this mall started with discussions between Gilbert J.C. McCurdy, owner of the McCurdy's department stores, and Maurice F. Forman, owner of the B. Forman Co. department stores. At that time, strip plazas were growing in popularity. Though both owners had opened branch stores, they were concerned about Downtown Rochester's viability and came up with the idea of an indoor shopping center.

Gruen was at the height of his influence when Midtown was completed, and the project attracted international attention, including a nationally televised feature report on NBC-TV's Huntley-Brinkley Report the night of its opening in April 1962. City officials and planners from around the globe came to see Gruen's solution to the mid-century urban crisis.  Midtown won several design awards.

Gruen described the aerial view of Rochester as a giant parking lot with a few buildings to inconvenience traffic flow. His intention was to create a pedestrian-friendly town square for Rochester, NY, a medium-sized city near the mouth of the Genesee River.  He incorporated art, benches, fountains, a four hundred-seat auditorium, and a sidewalk cafe into his plans hoping to encourage the sort of social intermingling that he saw as the enriching essence of urban life.

Later in life, Gruen dismissed the strictly commercial suburban malls as "those bastard developments" but continued to hold Midtown in high regard. It is probably the project that closely followed his plan and shared his civic vision. In addition to the shopping center, the Plaza also included a skyscraper office building, which at one time held an upscale hotel and restaurant — the Top Of The Plaza — on its top four floors. Count Basie, Buddy Rich, Gap Mangione and many other nationally known jazz artists played at the Top Of The Plaza several times, and the restaurant was a popular site for receptions, business parties, and special-occasion dinners.

Midtown Plaza was economically vibrant and a center of retail activity for its region during its first 20 years of operation. It began to struggle in the 1980s as a number of suburban shopping malls opened outside of the city, while the region's population increasingly spread outward from the city center into suburban and even rural areas.  Surrounded by pockets of poverty, Midtown struggled to keep tenants. Midtown's struggles increased in the mid-1990s when the mall's two anchors, McCurdy's and Forman's, closed in 1994. Their closing was quickly followed by the closing of the Midtown branch of Wegmans Food Markets, a regional grocery chain. Once considered the sign of a New Urbanism, the Plaza was placed on the list of 2002 Empire Zones, and grew to be considered a symbolic victim of suburban sprawl.

During its last years, the mall's tenants included Peebles department store, Radio Shack, Payless Shoes, Foot Locker, some downscale clothing stores, a dollar store, two jewelry stores, a gift shop, a Record Theatre store which became the last original tenant in the mall and a US post office. The food court remained full during its final years, with tenants including Arby's, Burger King, Pizza Stop, Bruegger's, and Bill Gray's serving workers from the nearby Xerox Tower and Frontier Communications Building, whose offices were connected to the mall. Located directly underneath Midtown Plaza is a three-level, 1,843-space parking garage that still exists and serves the buildings now on the site.

Mall's closing
It was announced on October 16, 2007, that Midtown Plaza would be demolished via eminent domain to make way for the new PAETEC Headquarters. The ground was to be broken in the fall of 2010.

The final Christmas season at Midtown Plaza took place in 2007. A  Douglas Fir was donated to the mall by Dave Manioci, Midtown's Chief Engineer. A tribute to Midtown took place on December 1, 2007, which attracted thousands of people from Rochester and the surrounding areas to what was called "a magical event." The Monorail, operated every Christmas season, had its last run on December 24, 2007. All retail and office space at Midtown except for the adjoining Euclid Building wing was to conclude business activity on or before July 29, 2008, while some demolition work on unoccupied portions of the building complex began before that date. The Euclid building, which housed some offices and the studios of Clear Channel Communications' six Rochester area radio stations, closed at midnight on December 31, 2008. Clear Channel moved to new quarters in the HSBC Bank downtown Rochester office tower, in a studio complex formerly occupied by CBS Radio.

On July 29, 2008, Midtown Plaza closed its doors to the public for the last time, as scheduled.

Many retail and service businesses operating at Midtown Plaza during its final months relocated and re-opened in other locations in or near downtown Rochester, some taking advantage of relocation help offered by the City of Rochester.

On Tuesday, November 3, 2009, the last occupant of Midtown Plaza, the Adirondack Transit Lines intercity bus station, closed.  The bus station relocated five blocks away, near the railroad station.

Clock of Nations
Midtown Plaza was well known for its Clock of Nations, designed by Geri Kavanaugh. The clock, which represents 12 nations, has 12 cylinders, each with a scene with puppets for each nation. Considered a significant piece of art when unveiled, the original puppetry was not well maintained and was replaced in the mid-1970s with the work of a local artist. The clock was moved to the Greater Rochester International Airport terminal, but it is now dismantled, removed from the airport, and in storage due to airport renovation. Its next home cannot be confirmed.

Demolition
On September 27, 2010, demolition began on Midtown Plaza. Mayor Robert Duffy announced that within a few months, the site would be ready for the construction of the new PAETEC Headquarters. PAETEC later further scaled back plans for an ambitious new building and instead opted for a smaller office complex based on a reconstruction and expansion of the nearby Seneca Building.

Reconstruction

Midtown Tower

In 2011 the high-rise tower section of Midtown Plaza was stripped to a skeletal state in preparation for its conversion to a mixed-use residential and commercial building, expected to be completed and opened around 2015. The Tower was sold by the city to the local construction and re-development company Buckingham Properties, who renamed the tower Tower 280 At Midtown. In 2014 Midtown Tower began its redevelopment into a mix of residential and commercial space, a partnership between Buckingham Properties and Morgan Management. With about thirty leases signed, its first occupants began moving in on January 15, 2016. Branca, an Italian restaurant with a location in Bushnell's Basin, opened its second location within the new Tower 280.

Seneca Building
The building known as the Seneca Building (the only other remaining building from the former mall) was remodeled as a standalone unit and opened as an office building for Windstream, who bought PAETEC in 2011. The building opened in 2013. As part of the demolition, the upper floors of the building were removed, leaving only Floors 1-4.

Democrat and Chronicle Building

In 2013 it was announced that Gannett was moving its headquarters for the Democrat and Chronicle as part of the paper's downsizing from its location in the Gannett Building on Exchange Street to a building in front of the Seneca Building as an addition at the corner of Main Street and Clinton Ave. The Democrat and Chronicle Media Group occupy the first two floors. The new building also contains a television studio and a restaurant space. The third floors of both buildings connect and are accessible through the Seneca Building Windstream elevator lobby. The building began construction in 2015. It opened on May 2, 2016, with the first day of Democrat and Chronicle operation out of the building.

Parcel 5
Original plans for the site called for a new performing arts center to be built along Main Street next to the Seneca Building. In 2012 then mayor Thomas Richards refused to help the Rochester Broadway Theatre League find funding for the project, among other issues between the organization and city hall. This led the RBTL to change plans and have the theatre built in the future development of what is now the Medley Centre in Irondequoit.

In 2014, the new mayor Lovely Warren began talks with the RBTL about plans for a performing arts center on the midtown site once again after promised developments with the Irondequoit site failed to materialize. Warren has issued a request for $200 million from New York State to fund the project. The funds are currently pending.

In 2016 the city put out a request for proposals for a new performing arts center. Two proposals were presented, one by the Seneca Nation of Indians, which included a combined performing arts center and Casino gaming center; this project would have been completely funded by the Senecas. The second proposal came from Wilmorite, Delaware North, and Batavia OTB, all casino/gaming operators in other areas for a stand-alone performing arts center that would require some funding from the state. The second proposal was a response to the proposal by the Senecas as the three partners are opposed to downtown Rochester gaming. However, when proposals were due in September 2016, there were five submitted. None were from Wimorite or the Senecas. There was, however, a Performing Arts Center proposal submitted by the Rochester Broadway Theatre League. Other proposed developments include a park-like proposal with retail stands on the outside and a proposal from the owner of Harts Local Grocers to break the property into smaller lots and build three or four-story retail and living spaces.

On April 7, 2017, the City of Rochester chose a modified Rochester Broadway Theatre League proposal which, in partnership with Morgan Development, included a Performing Arts Center to be called the Golisano Center for the Performing Arts in honor of a major donation made to the project funding by Tom Golisano and a residential tower including approximately 150 rental units with retail and restaurant space at street level. Following the decision, there was widespread skepticism of the viability of the project, which became a major point of debate during the 2017 mayoral elections.

On March 6, 2018, further plans were announced for a rooftop stage as well as an IMAX theater in the performing arts center in off peak hours as well as a new name Golisano Arts and Entertainment Complex at Midtown Commons. After issues raising the funds needed to make the project a reality, they moved the proposed project to the site of the Riverside Hotel on Main Street by the Genesee River. In 2021, it was decided to make the site a smaller entertainment and gathering place inspired by the Kansas City Power & Light District and Canalside in Buffalo.

Butler/Till Building
Morgan development and Buckingham Properties constructed a five-story building on the former Wegmans site at the corner of Broad Street and Clinton Avenue. The building includes first-floor retail, Class A office space on the second and third floors, and a mix of housing on the remaining floors. Outdoor space is also included. Media services company Butler/Till moved its headquarters from Henrietta to occupy the first three floors in addition to co-owing the building. Construction began in 2020 and was completed in 2021.

Other features
With the redevelopment came a full modernization and repair of the three-level, 1,843-space parking garage under the site. The garage is used for employees of Windstream in the Seneca Building and the Tower 280 At Midtown residents and employees, Democrat and Chronicle employees, Butler/Till employees, and for events at parcel 5 and in the immediate area.

A new streetscape has also been constructed on the site, complete with new sidewalks, traffic signals, and a common area between the Seneca building and Midtown Tower, now called Midtown Commons, complete with benches and soon-to-be-placed public art. Labella Associates, DPC, and Trowbridge Wolf Michaels Landscape Architects LLP were responsible for the new design.

References

Further reading
The Heart of Our Cities, Victor Gruen
''Mall Maker'', M. Jeffrey Hardwick

External links
 Tower 280 at Midtown official site
Midtown Rising Page
Parcel 5 Official Site

Shopping malls in New York (state)
Demolished shopping malls in the United States
Commercial buildings in Rochester, New York
Defunct shopping malls in the United States
Shopping malls established in 1962
Shopping malls disestablished in 2008
2008 disestablishments in New York (state)
Buildings and structures under construction in the United States
1962 establishments in New York (state)
Victor Gruen buildings
Buildings and structures demolished in 2010
Demolished buildings and structures in New York (state)